Little Devils Postpile is a columnar basalt rock formation in the Sierra Nevada, located within Yosemite National Park and eastern Tuolumne County, California. 

The formation is a set of columnar joints in a basalt plug resembling the larger formation in Devils Postpile National Monument, to the south in the Sierra Nevada. It is located along the Tuolumne River, several miles west of Tuolumne Meadows.

See also
List of places with columnar jointed volcanics

References
 Schaffer, Jeffrey P.  "Evolution of the Yosemite Landscape -- Late-Cenozoic Volcanism and Faulting"; in One Hundred Hikes in Yosemite.
  NPS.gov: Geology field notes for Devils Postpile National Monument

Columnar basalts
Rock formations of Yosemite National Park
Landforms of Tuolumne County, California
Tuolumne River
Volcanic plugs of California
Quaternary California